Alphonsea tsangyuanensis is a species of plant in the Annonaceae family. It is endemic to China.

References

Flora of China
tsangyuanensis
Endangered plants
Taxonomy articles created by Polbot